The Netherlands Football League Championship 1917–1918 was contested by 51 teams participating in five divisions. The national champion would be determined by a play-off featuring the winners of the eastern, northern, southern and two western football divisions of the Netherlands. AFC Ajax won this year's championship by beating Go Ahead, Willem II, AFC and Be Quick 1887.

New entrants

Eerste Klasse East:
Promoted from 2nd Division: EFC PW 1885 (returning after three seasons of absence)
Eerste Klasse North:
Promoted from 2nd Division: HSC
Eerste Klasse South:
Promoted from 2nd Division: HVV Helmond
Eerste Klasse West-A:
Promoted from 2nd Division: AFC Ajax (returning after three seasons of absence)

Eerste Klasse West-B: (new division)
Feijenoord
AFC
Amstel
VV Concordia
De Spartaan
Dordrecht
DVS Rotterdam
Hermes DVS
HVV 't Gooi
RFC Rotterdam
SVV
VVA

Divisions

Eerste Klasse East

Eerste Klasse North

Eerste Klasse South

Eerste Klasse West-A

Eerste Klasse West-B

Championship play-off

References
RSSSF Netherlands Football League Championships 1898-1954
RSSSF Eerste Klasse Oost
RSSSF Eerste Klasse Noord
RSSSF Eerste Klasse Zuid
RSSSF Eerste Klasse West

Netherlands Football League Championship seasons
1917–18 in Dutch football
Netherlands